Mengo can refer to:
Mengo, Uganda
Mengo Hospital
Mengo Senior School
Clube de Regatas do Flamengo
Letin Mengo, an electric car